A fire temple, Agiary, Atashkadeh, Atashgah or Dar-e Mehr is the place of worship for the followers of Zoroastrianism, the ancient religion of Iran (Persia). In the Zoroastrian religion, fire (see atar), together with clean water (see aban), are agents of ritual purity. Clean, white "ash for the purification ceremonies [is] regarded as the basis of ritual life", which "are essentially the rites proper to the tending of a domestic fire, for the temple [fire] is that of the hearth fire raised to a new solemnity". For, one "who sacrifices unto fire with fuel in his hand ..., is given happiness". There are about 177 odd fire temples in the world, of which some 150 are in India.

List of Fire temples in India

See also 
 List of fire temples in Iran
 Zoroastrianism in India
 Religions in India
 Religious tourism in India

References 

Fire temples